I Need You is the third compilation album from American recording artist LeAnn Rimes. The album was first released on January 30, 2001, through Curb Records to help satisfy Rimes' recording contract obligations during litigation with the label and her management. Rimes publicly disowned the album just days after its release, causing it to be discontinued. The album was then officially released by Rimes on March 26, 2002, with four additional tracks and a new recording: "Light the Fire Within". In 2008, the album was released as a package with Rimes' debut album, Blue (1996).

I Need You received mixed reviews by music critics, who praised its pop appeal but criticized the selection of the songs, noting that none of them made a significant impact on the listeners. In the United States, the album peaked at number one on the Billboard Top Country Albums chart, and reached number ten on the Billboard 200. Internationally, it peaked at number four on the Finnish Albums Chart, number ten on the Canadian Albums Chart, and number eleven on both the Austrian Albums Chart and the Irish Album Chart. The album was certified Gold by the Recording Industry Association of America (RIAA), among other organizations, and was certified platinum by both Music Canada and the IFPI Finland.

Background and development
The tracks on I Need You were taken from various studio tracks released between 1999 and 2001, as well as B-sides tracks to help satisfy Rimes' recording contract obligations during litigation with the label and her management. During the litigation with her label, Rimes asked "that Curb give Rimes the rights to all past recordings and videos, give up all publishing interests in her compositions and destroy all currently available recordings." The album was publicly disowned by Rimes four days after its 2001 release, with Rimes stating that: "[t]his album was made without my creative input, it consists largely of unfinished material and songs that didn't make other albums ... I want to make abundantly clear to you that this album is not a reflection of myself as an artist but is solely the conception of Curb Records, and for that I am truly and deeply sorry."

Songs
The duet with Elton John, called "Written in the Stars", was released as a single on February 23, 1999 from the Elton John and Tim Rice's Aida concept album. The album contains the alternate version featured on the single. "I Need You" was slated on the Jesus: Music From and Inspired by the Epic Mini Series soundtrack released on March 8, 2000. It was released as a single on July 18, 2000, for the soundtrack. "But I Do Love You" and "Can't Fight the Moonlight" were included on the soundtrack for Coyote Ugly on August 1, 2000. "Can't Fight the Moonlight" was released as a single for the soundtrack on August 22, 2000, and the B-side track, "But I Do Love You", was released as a single from the soundtrack internationally on February 11, 2002. and in the US two weeks later on February 26.

Release and promotion

The album was first released on January 30, 2001, by Curb Records. and featured an alternate country version of "But I Do Love You". "You Are" was released on the soundtrack for Angel Eyes after the album's release. "Soon" was also launched after the release of the album on the soundtrack for Driven. After Rimes disowned the 2001 release, it was discontinued, and she officially re-issued the album on March 26, 2002. It contained all ten original tracks from the 2001 release with an extended version of "You Are"; a bonus song, "Light the Fire Within", which Rimes performed at the 2002 Winter Olympics opening ceremony in Salt Lake City; and four bonus remixes. The 2002 release also contains the version of "But I Do Love You" featured on the Coyote Ugly soundtrack. On May 13, 2008, the 2002 release was packaged together with Rimes' debut album, Blue (1996).

Two promotional singles were released from the album. "You Are" was released in 2001. The song was featured on the soundtrack for Angel Eyes on May 18, 2001, and was included on the Asian release of The Best of LeAnn Rimes, as well as the remixed edition. "You Are" is a pop song with a duration of four minutes and fifty-eight seconds, and it was written by Laurie Webb. Mark Huxley at Barnes & Noble.com called the song a "full-on dance-pop". "Soon" was released in 2001 as a promotional CD single that consisted of the album version of the song and the Graham Stack Radio Edit of the song. "Soon" is a ballad  of three minutes and fifty-three seconds. The song, which was written by Diane Warren, is in the key of D-flat major with Rimes' vocals spanning two octaves, from G3 to E5. The song was featured on the soundtrack for Driven, which was released on April 27, 2001. Mark Huxley at Barnes & Noble.com praised the song, claiming that "Rimes is back on more familiar turf on the big ballad[s]." A review in Billboard stated that the song "leans more towards the AC side then anything resembling true country." It peaked at fourteen on the Billboard Adult Contemporary Chart.

Critical reception

Mark Huxley at Barnes & Noble gave a positive review of the album, saying that Rimes is "comfortably adopting some distinctly modern sonic elements without sacrificing her tradition-steeped country roots." Alanna Nash of Entertainment Weekly gave a mixed review about the album, saying "The good news about Rimes' latest: It reprises two songs, 'But I Do Love You' and 'Can't Fight the Moonlight,' from the Coyote Ugly soundtrack. Now the bad: You'll snooze through the rest, except 'Written in the Stars', her slugfest duet with Elton John. If only you could sleep through that."

Stephen Thomas Erlewine of AllMusic also gave a mixed review, stating that "Rimes' impressive voice sounds restrained in this setting, too self-consciously mature. In a nutshell, that's the problem with I Need You -- it's a teenager attempting to make a thirtysomething album. That she occasionally succeeds is a testament to her vocal talents and the skills of her producers, but it shouldn't be surprising that it also feels awkward for large stretches, never quite becoming as alluring as Breathe, because this is a sound that she needs to grow into to be totally convincing." Rolling Stone gave the album two-and-a-half out of five stars and called the album "synthetic-feeling." Trisha Huenke of About.com gave the album four out of five stars and praised it for its pop sound, stating that, "Finally we have an artist who is straightforward about the fact that she wants to sing pop music."

Commercial performance
I Need You debuted at number ten on the Billboard 200; with 84,915 copies sold in its first week, falling to number twenty-three in its second week with 54,877 copies sold, number twenty-six with 63,792 copies in its third week, and number forty-two with 40,720 copies in its fourth week. It spent four weeks in the top fifty and a total of thirty weeks in Billboard 200. It also debuted at number one on the Billboard Top Country Albums.

Internationally, the album performed well, peaking at number four on the Finnish Albums Chart, number ten on the Canadian Albums Chart, and number eleven on both the Austrian Albums Chart and the Irish Album Charts. The album also peaked at number five on the Swedish Albums Chart and number six on the Swiss Albums Chart. It peaked at number seven on both the UK Albums Chart and the European Top 100 Albums.

I Need You also peaked at number five on the year-end charts in Finnish Albums Chart, and thirteen on the Billboard Top Country Albums. The album was certified Gold by the RIAA as well the IFPI Denmark, the Recording Industry Association of New Zealand, the International Federation of the Phonographic Industry and the British Phonographic Industry and was certified Platinum by both Music Canada and the IFPI Finland.

Track listing

Notes
  Although the 2002 re-issue in the US features an extended version of "You Are" on it, the track listing on the back cover of the CD still gives the 2001 issue duration. However, this does not appear on the Japanese re-issue.
  signifies remix producer

Personnel
Credits for I Need You were adapted from liner notes. Additional credits adapted from liner notes of the Coyote Ugly soundtrack, the Jesus: Music From and Inspired by the Epic-Mini Series soundtrack, and the Aida concept album.

 Almighty Associates – producer,  remixer
 Eddie Bayers – drums
 Curt Bisquera – drums
 Mike Brignardello – bass guitar
 Charlie Brocco – assistant engineer on "Written in the Stars"
 David Campbell – orchestral arrangement
 Sue Ann Carwell – background vocals
 The Choristers of Cathedral of the Madeleine Choir School – background vocals on "Light the Fire Within"
 Peter Collins – producer
 Mike Curb – producer
 Austin Deptula – assistant engineer, additional engineer, engineer, keyboards
 David Foster – arrangement, producer
 Micheal "Grimey" Grimes – drums
 Omar Hakeem – drums, percussion
 Mike Hanna – additional arrangement
 Niki Harris – background vocals
 Carl Herrgesell – harmonium, Wurlitzer
 John Holbrook – mixer, engineer, recording
 Trevor Horn – producer
 Chuck Howard – producer
 Greg Hunt – chief engineer, additional engineer
 Andrew Pryce Jackman – orchestral arrangement
 Elton John* – musical director, vocals on "Written in the Stars"
 Annagray Labasse – background vocals
 Gary Leach – assistant engineer, additional engineer, engineer, keyboards
 Keith Lockhart – music director for Utah Symphony
 Steve MacCillan – mixer, engineer
 Edgar Meyer – acoustic bass
 Kenny Mims – acoustic guitar electric guitar
 Jamie Muhoberac – bass guitar, keyboards
 Tim Pierce – electric guitar
 LeAnn Rimes – lead vocals, co-producer, background vocals
 Wilbur C. Rimes – producer
 John "J.R." Robinson – drums
 William Ross – orchestrations, conductor
 Lee Sklar – bass guitar 
 Graham Stack – producer,  remixer
 Edward Szymczak – assistant engineer on "Written in the Stars"
 Utah Symphony – orchestra
 Fred Vaughn – choir arrangement
 Marty Walsh – acoustic guitar, electric guitar, mandolin
 Tim Weidner – additional engineer
 Craig Young – bass guitar

*Note: According to the liner notes, Elton John appears courtesy of The Rocket Record Company.

Charts and certifications

Weekly charts

Year-end charts

Sales and certifications

Songs

Release history

References

2001 compilation albums
LeAnn Rimes albums
Curb Records compilation albums
Albums produced by Trevor Horn
Albums produced by Peter Collins (record producer)
Albums produced by Mike Curb